Saint-Jean-de-Beugné is a commune in the Vendée department, region of Pays de la Loire, western France.

It being known for the briochery Sicard, established 1973 by Roger Sicard.

Geography
The river Smagne forms most of the commune's north-western border.

See also
Communes of the Vendée department

References

Communes of Vendée